The following is a list of awards and nominations received by English actor Tom Hardy. He was nominated for the Academy Award for Best Supporting Actor for the 2015 film The Revenant. He also won the 2011 BAFTA Rising Star Award, and has twice won the British Independent Film Award for Best Actor, for Bronson (2009) and Legend (2015).

Major associations

Academy Awards
The Academy Awards, commonly known as the "Oscars", are a set of awards given annually for excellence of cinematic achievements. The awards, organised by the Academy of Motion Picture Arts and Sciences (AMPAS), were first held in 1929 at The Hollywood Roosevelt Hotel. Hardy has received one nomination and lost to Mark Rylance for his work on Bridge of Spies.

British Academy Film Awards
The BAFTA Award is an annual award show presented by the British Academy of Film and Television Arts. The awards were founded in 1947 as The British Film Academy, by David Lean, Alexander Korda, Carol Reed, Charles Laughton, Roger Manvell and others. Hardy has received one award from one nominations.

British Academy Television Awards
The BAFTA TV Award is an annual award show presented by the British Academy of Film and Television Arts. The awards were founded in 1955 as the British Academy Television Awards. Hardy has received one nomination.

Other associations

AACTA Award

Australian Film Critics Association Awards

Awards Circuit Community Awards

British Independent Film Award

C21's International Drama Awards

Central Ohio Film Critics Association

Chlotrudis Awards

Crime Thriller Awards

Critics' Choice Movie Awards

Dallas–Fort Worth Film Critics Association

Denver Film Critics Society

Detroit Film Critics Society

Dorian Awards

Dublin Film Critics' Circle

Empire Awards

European Film Awards

Evening Standard British Film Awards

Golden Carp Film Award

Georgia Film Critics Association

Gold Derby

Golden Schmoes Awards

Hollywood Critics Association

Houston Film Critics Society

Indiana Film Journalists Association

IndieWire Critics Poll

International Online Cinema Awards

Italian Online Movie Awards

Jupiter Award

Kansas City Film Critics Circle Awards

London Film Critics' Circle

Los Angeles Film Critics Association Awards

MTV Movie & TV Awards

National Society of Film Critics

Nevada Film Critics Society

North Carolina Film Critics Association

Online Film & Television Association

People's Choice Awards

Phoenix Critics Circle

Phoenix Film Critics Society Awards

Royal Television Society

Russian National Movie Awards

San Diego Film Critics Society Awards

Sant Jordi Awards

Satellite Awards

Saturn Awards

Scream Awards

Seattle Film Critics Awards

St. Louis Film Critics Association

Teen Choice Awards

Toronto Film Critics Association

Village Voice Film Poll

Washington DC Area Film Critics Association Awards

Women Film Critics Circle

References

Hardy, Tom